This is a list of potential restrictions and regulations on private ownership of slot machines in the United States on a state by state basis.

References

External links
Gambling Law US
U.S. Slot Machine Laws & Statutes by State, Gameroom Show

Gambling regulation in the United States
Slot machines
States of the United States law-related lists